Konia is a village in the Paphos District of Cyprus, located 3 km east of Paphos. 
In the northwest is Anavargos village, Armou in the northeast, Marathounta East and Yeroskipou in the South.

Topography 
Built at an altitude of 200 meters the village of Konia with about 2,000 inhabitants, is constantly developing.

References

Communities in Paphos District